Tracy Kraft-Tharp is an American teacher and politician who serves on the county commission in Jefferson County, Colorado. Prior to her tenure on the county commission she served in the Colorado House of Representatives from the 29th district from 2013 to 2021, as a member of the Democratic Party.

Kraft-Tharp was educated at Minnesota State University Moorhead and the University of Denver before working at Metropolitan State University, and Regis University. She defeated incumbent Republican Representative Robert Ramirez in the 2012 election for a seat in the state house and was reelected in the 2014, 2016, and 2018 elections. During her tenure she chaired the Business Affairs and Labor committee. She defeated incumbent Commissioner Libby Szabo for a seat on the Jefferson County Commission in the 2020 election.

Early life and education

Tracy Kraft-Tharp graduated from Minnesota State University Moorhead with a bachelor's degree in psychology, sociology and education and from the University of Denver with a master of social work in social work and a Juris Doctor. She worked as a teacher at a middle school, Metropolitan State University, and Regis University, youth counselor in a juvenile detention center, and social worker. She married Vern Tharp.

Career

Colorado House of Representatives

Robert Ramirez, a Republican member of the Colorado House of Representatives from the 29th district, was targeted by the Democratic Party in the 2012 election as he won in the 2010 election by 197 votes. Kraft-Tharp won the Democratic primary and defeated Ramirez and Libertarian nominee Hans V. Romer in the election. She defeated Republican nominee Susan Kochevar and Libertarian nominee Romer in the 2014 election. Ramirez was initially the Republican nominee, but withdrew and a vacancy committee selected Kochevar to replace him. She defeated Republican nominee Kochevar in the 2016 election. Kraft-Tharp defeated Republican nominee Grady Nouis and Libertarian nominee Romer in the 2018 election after she raised $129,699 while Nouis raised $38,762.

One of Kraft-Tharp's aides accused Representative Steve Lebsock of sexual harassment. During her tenure in the state house she served on the Appropriations and Finance committees and chaired the Business Affairs and Labor committee.

Kraft-Tharp declined to seek an appointment to replace Senator Evie Hudak. She considered running to succeed Ed Perlmutter in the United States House of Representatives from Colorado's 7th congressional district during the 2018 election. She endorsed Hillary Clinton during the 2016 Democratic presidential primaries and Joe Biden during the 2020 Democratic presidential primaries.

Local politics

Kraft-Tharp was a member of the Jefferson County PTA. She announced her campaign for a county commission seat in Jefferson County, Colorado, on November 6, 2019, with Lindsey Rasmussen as her campaign manager. She defeated incumbent Republican commissioner Libby Szabo and Libertarian nominee Romer. During her tenure on the commission she served as the chair pro tem.

Political positions

Kraft-Tharp voted against renaming Columbus Day to be in honor of Frances Xavier Cabrini. She received an A rating from NARAL Pro-Choice America. Her scores from the American Civil Liberties Union ranged from 89% in 2013, 60% in 2015, and 83% in 2019, while receiving 100% in 2014, 2016, 2017, and 2018.

Electoral history

References

External links
Jefferson County Board of County Commissioners website
Official page at the Colorado General Assembly
Campaign site
 
Links formerly displayed via the CongLinks template:
 Biography at Ballotpedia
 Financial information (state office) at the National Institute for Money in State Politics

Place of birth missing (living people)
Year of birth missing (living people)
Living people
Schoolteachers from Colorado
Democratic Party members of the Colorado House of Representatives
Regis University faculty
Women state legislators in Colorado
21st-century American politicians
21st-century American women politicians
American women academics
County commissioners in Colorado